Balmedie is a large village in Aberdeenshire in Scotland.  It lies north of the city of Aberdeen, in the civil parish of Belhelvie.  The long and wide beach is bordered by an extensive dune system that stretches  from Aberdeen to just north of the Ythan Estuary at Newburgh. The dynamic dunes has  marram grass as the principal vegetation.   They support a large array of wildlife. Two watercourses make their way to the sea within the area creating ribbons of wetland vegetation along their course. The village is near the Sands of Forvie Site of Special Scientific Interest, the fifth largest sand dune system in Britain; this is an integral part of the Ythan Estuary, which separates the sands from Balmedie Beach.

Balmedie village
The village's facilities include a primary school, a small library and a sports centre. Shops include a small supermarket, a pharmacy, a fish and chip shop, Chinese takeaway and a convenience store/post office. Other services include a car mechanic, and the White Horse Inn (a hotel, bar and restaurant). In 2007, Barratt Developments established its Barratt Homes North Scotland headquarters in Balmedie. Stagecoach East Scotland provides 'Bluebird' bus services linking the area with Aberdeen, Ellon, Fraserburgh and Peterhead.

There are four small play parks in Balmedie there are also two full-sized football pitches where amateur side Trophies International play their home matches.

Balmedie Country Park
The Balmedie Country Park provides amenities within the dunes for visitors, including parking, toilets, wooden walkways across the sands and streams, picnic areas with barbecues, and a swing park with a fishing theme. The park is often used by horse riders as a starting / finishing point for beach rides with room to park a horsebox or trailer. The beach is also known for its vast dunes.

The park is open during the hours of daylight every day of the year. Over the years the beach has won a number of awards.

During the Second World War, Balmedie Beach was designated as a bomb cemetery.  Defused and unexploded bombs from Luftwaffe raids in Aberdeen were brought here to be cleaned of explosives or detonated on the foreshore. Three pillboxes were built on the dunes at Balmedie to protect a small radar station consisting of three masts.  Anti-tank blocks are also located in the dunes along with remains of the barbed wire defences just to the north.

Menie Estate

The house was designed by the Aberdeen architect John Smith for George Turner around 1835. It is listed as category B by Historic Scotland.

During the Second World War, a beach minefield was laid beside the Mill of Menie in case of a German invasion. The minefield was cleared by the 11th Coy Bomb Disposal under Major W.M. Hewitt of the Royal Engineers.  During construction of the Menie golf course, the rusting harmless fragments of a landmine were found.

In 2006, Donald Trump purchased a large part of the estate and proposed to build an extensive development, including two 18-hole golf courses, a 450-room hotel, conference centre and spa, 36 golf villas, 950 holiday homes, accommodation for 400 staff and residential developments comprising 500 houses. Although this would substantially damage habitat at a Site of Special Scientific Interest, according to analysis by Scottish Natural Heritage, planning officials from Aberdeenshire Council recommended approval of the development. This subject was covered by documentary film maker Anthony Baxter in his 2011 film You've Been Trumped.

Legal dispute

In December 2015, Trump's attempt to prevent a windfarm being built within sight of his golf course  was dismissed by five justices at the Supreme Court. Commenting on the decision, former Scottish First Minister Alex Salmond branded Trump "three times a loser", in reference to his losses in lower Scottish courts leading up to the Supreme Court case. A spokesman for the Trump Organization responded to Salmond's comment by saying: "Does anyone care what this man thinks? He’s a hasbeen and totally irrelevant."

The director of WWF Scotland stated, "This result is great news for Scotland and for all those interested in tackling climate change and creating jobs".

Vattenfall decided to proceed with 11 turbines in the 92 MW wind farm in July 2016. The project, formally named the European Offshore Wind Deployment Centre, was completed in late 2018.

References

External links

Webcam view from Merlin Terrace Newburgh n/r Balmedie

Villages in Aberdeenshire
Parks in Aberdeenshire